Song day may refer to:

Songs Day, a Japanese festival
River Đáy, a river of Vietnam